Sonic Solutions was an American computer software company headquartered in Novato, California. In addition to having a number of offices in the U.S., the company also maintained offices in Europe and Asia. It was acquired by Rovi Corporation in 2010.

History

Sonic Solutions was created by former Lucasfilm employees Robert Doris, Mary Sauer and scientist Andy Moorer who developed the SoundDroid digital audio editing system as part of the Droid Works project at the Lucasfilm Computer Division. (Another notable spinoff of the division is Pixar.)

Sonic developed and marketed The Sonic System, a professional non-linear digital audio workstation for music editing, restoration and CD preparation.

Sonic received an Emmy Award for technical achievement in 1996. In the same year the company worked with numerous Hollywood studios and consumer electronic manufactures to introduce the first commercial DVD production system. Sonic extended its business to enterprise software areas with its DVD authoring systems for professional use (Sonic Scenarist and Sonic DVD Producer) as well as retail and PC OEM DVD software applications for home use (DVDit, MyDVD, and RecordNow).

In 2002, Sonic spun off their entire audio division as Sonic Studio, LLC, to concentrate solely on the DVD marketplace, enterprise software and licensing of IP and source code. Notable customers included Microsoft, Apple, Google, Adobe and Avid. Its middleware and embedded chip included deals with Texas Instruments, Broadcom, Scientific Atlanta/Cisco, Marvell, and Intel.

Sonic expanded to the consumer software business (photo, audio and video editing) in 2000, shipping roughly 50 million copies per year through direct web sales and over 15,000 retail store fronts including Apple Store, Walmart, Costco, Best Buy, Target, Dixon's and MediaMart. It grew to command a 64% market share in its category.

Since its IPO, the company has generated over $1.5 billion in revenue in the digital media category and has been named one of Forbes, Fortune and BusinessWeek's fastest growing companies on multiple occasions.

In 2005, Sonic began moving its consumer software business to a SAAS model.

By 2010 Sonic was one of the largest providers of premium movies via the Web and CE devices, in partnership with major movie studios. Sonic held the rights to the movies and provided cloud delivery as a white label provider.

Acquisitions

Sonic’s major acquisitions include the Desktop and Mobile Division (DMD) of VERITAS Software Corporation in 2002, Roxio in 2003 (consumer applications for Windows and Mac OS), and Simple Star (online slideshow creation)  and CinemaNow in 2008 (digital movie delivery). In October 2010, the company acquired DivX Inc. in a $326 million stock and cash deal as the digital-media provider moves to enhance online video offerings.

Sale

On December 23, 2010, Rovi Corporation announced its intention to acquire the company. The sale was a cash stock deal for just under $1 billion. According to a February 2011 article in Business Insider, Sonic yielded the highest return of any publicly traded company on the NYSE or NASDAQ markets. Both stocks rose on the deal announcement, creating a 66% premium above market. The acquisition was completed early the next year. In January 2012, Rovi announced that it would be selling the Roxio division and product line to Corel.

Products

Consumer
 CinemaNow
 CinePlayer
 Creator (originally released as Easy Media Creator, and later renamed Roxio Creator)
 DivX
 Easy VHS to DVD
 MyDVD
 PhotoShow
 Toast

Professional
  BD PowerStation
  CineVision
 MainConcept Reference
  Scenarist

References

External links
 Official website

Companies based in Marin County, California
Software companies established in 1987
Software companies based in the San Francisco Bay Area
Novato, California
2010 mergers and acquisitions
Defunct software companies of the United States